WizardWorks Group, Inc. was an American video game developer and publisher based in Minneapolis, Minnesota. The company was founded in 1980 and, in 1993, WizardWorks opened the CompuWorks and MacSoft divisions. In 1996, WizardWorks was acquired by GT Interactive to become part of their GT Value Products umbrella, which was later abandoned. Through acquisitions, GT Interactive became Atari. On March 29, 2004, Atari, Inc. closed down all operations of WizardWorks, and folded outstanding projects into their publishing branch in Beverly, Massachusetts.

Games published 
 911 Fire Rescue
 Advanced Dungeons & Dragons: Collectors Edition
 Beach Head 2000
 Blake Stone: Aliens of Gold
 Carnivores
 Carnivores 2
 Carnivores Ice Age
 Casper
 Championship Pool
 Chasm: The Rift
 Claw
 D!ZONE
 Damage Incorporated
 Deer Hunter
 Deer Hunter 2: Monster Buck Pack
 Deer Hunter 2
 Deer Hunter 3 Gold
 Deer Hunter 3
 Deer Hunter 4
 Deer Hunter 5: Tracking Trophies
 Dirt Track Racing: Sprint Cars
 Dirt Track Racing: Australia
 Dirt Track Racing
 Duke: Nuclear Winter
 Duke: The Apocalypse
 Duke!ZONE
 Duke!ZONE II
 Duke Assault
 Duke Caribbean: Life's a Beach
 Duke it out in D.C.
 Duke Nukem II
 Duke Xtreme
 Emergency: Fighters for Life
 Fun Pack 3D
 H!ZONE
 Hell to Pay
 Harley-Davidson: Race Across America
 In Pursuit of Greed
 Innova Disc Golf
 Leadfoot
 Montezuma's Return
 Ozzie's Forest
 Perdition's Gate
 Phantasie III: The Wrath of Nikademus
 Q!ZONE
 Rudolph's Magical Sleigh Ride
 Robot Arena
 Rocky Mountain Trophy Hunter
 S!ZONE (City pack for SimCity and SimCity 2000)
 Secret of the Silver Blades
 Skunny
 Sporting Clays
 StarCraft: Retribution
 Stargunner
 Swamp Buggy Racing
 Treasures of the Savage Frontier
 W!ZONE
 X-Men: The Ravages of Apocalypse

References

External links 
  (archived on October 9, 2001)

Video game companies established in 1980
Video game companies disestablished in 2004
Defunct video game companies of the United States